The annually recurring Great Tibetan Marathon is a marathon that takes place on the Tibetan Plateau in northern India – also known as little Tibet.

The Great Tibetan Marathon is unusual in that it happens in an elevation of 3,500 meters in spiritual Buddhist surroundings. The high elevation makes the oxygen level extremely low and the marathon equally more physically challenging. But the position in the Himalayan mountains also gives an unparalleled dimension of beauty to the marathon.

An extra feature is the atmosphere of the Tibetan Buddhism that rubs off on the whole adventure. The start of the marathon will be blown on long Buddhist horns, instead of the traditional shot by a starting pistol, and all runners are blessed by Buddhist monks, who also serve as helpers along the way.

The Great Tibetan Marathon 2007, runners participated from all over the world. The runners were competing in the distances: marathon, half marathon, 10K and 5K. Rigzin Khandap was one of the top finishers who were invited with the other runners for dinner at The Honorable minister of Ladakh, Mr. Jora Rigzin. In 2009, 74 runners from all over the world finished the three distances: marathon, half marathon and 10 km. Majority of runners came from India and Europe with a minority coming from Southeast Asia and North Asia including Kenny Ng from Singapore who participated in the full marathon twice in 2007 and 2008. The event did not take place in 2010.

Preparation: As it is a high elevation race, organizers recommend that participants arrive in Ladakh a week before the race to get acclimatized to the conditions. As part of the race schedule, the organizers also include a trial run and a trek in the 2 days prior to race day to ensure runners get a sense of the task at hand. The medical team also checks the runners after the trial runs to see whether their bodies have acclimatized to the conditions.

Past winners

See also
Adventure running

External links
 Official website

Marathons in India
Sport in Jammu and Kashmir
Ladakh
Sport in Ladakh
Year of establishment missing